Neophocaena is a genus of porpoise native to the Indian and Pacific oceans, as well as the freshwater habitats of the Yangtze River basin in China. They are commonly known as finless porpoises. Genetic studies indicate that Neophocaena is the most basal living member of the porpoise family. 

There are three species in this genus:

Description 
The finless porpoises are the only porpoises to lack a true dorsal fin. Instead there is a low ridge covered in thick skin bearing several lines of tiny tubercles. In addition, the forehead is unusually steep compared with those of other porpoises. With fifteen to twenty-one teeth in each jaw, they also have, on average, fewer teeth than other porpoises, although there is some overlap, and this is a not a reliable means of distinguishing them.

References 

Porpoises
Taxa named by Theodore Sherman Palmer
Cetacean genera